Kenyon Garth Baines Ziehl (born 11 January 1963, in Rusape) is a Zimbabwean former rugby union player and cricketer.

Cricket career 
Ziehl played two first-class matches for Manicaland. Although he never played at international level with Zimbabwe, he played for Zimbabwe A.

Rugby union career 
Ziehl also played rugby union for Zimbabwe, being part of the 1987 Rugby World Cup squad, although he did not play any of the three pool stage matches in the tournament.

After career 
Since 2009, Zhiel is a franchise administrator for Mid West Rhinos. As of 2015, he was appointed national selection convenor by Zimbabwe Cricket, replacing Givemore Makoni.

In February 2020, he was named in Zimbabwe's squad for the Over-50s Cricket World Cup in South Africa. However, the tournament was cancelled during the third round of matches due to the coronavirus pandemic.

References 

1965 births
Living people
Zimbabwean rugby union players
Zimbabwean cricketers
Manicaland cricketers
White Zimbabwean sportspeople
Rugby union fullbacks
People from Rusape
Sportspeople from Manicaland Province